Headz or Tailz is the second studio album by American hip hop group Do Or Die. It was released on April 7, 1998, via Rap-A-Lot/Virgin Records. Recording sessions took place at Hippie House Studios and Knock Hard Studio in Houston and at Creator's Way Studios in Chicago. Production was handled by the Legendary Traxster, Mr. Lee and Mike Dean, with J. Prince serving as executive producer. It features guest appearances from Danny Boy, Johnny P., Beyond Content, Bushwick Bill, Chilla, Scarface, Shock Tha World, Twista and Val Young. The album peaked at number 13 on the Billboard 200 and number 3 on the Top R&B/Hip-Hop Albums. It was certified Gold by the Recording Industry Association of America on May 29, 1998. Its lead single, "Still Po Pimpin", reached at No. 62 on the Billboard Hot 100 and No. 16 on the Hot Rap Singles. The song "Bustin Back" is a diss track towards Bone Thugs-n-Harmony.

Track listing

Personnel
Darnell "Belo Zero" Smith – vocals
Dennis "AK47" Round – vocals
Anthony "N.A.R.D." Round – vocals (tracks: 1-3, 5, 7-17)
John "Johnny P" Pigram – vocals (tracks: 5, 6)
Daniel "Danny Boy" Steward – vocals (tracks: 5, 7)
Carl "Twista" Mitchell – vocals (track 6)
Beyond Content – vocals (track 8)
Valaria Marie Young – vocals (track 9)
Shock Tha World – vocals (track 10)
Charles "Chilla" Paxton – vocals (track 11)
Brad "Scarface" Jordan – vocals (track 13)
Richard "Bushwick Bill" Shaw – vocals (track 17)
Leroy "Mr. Lee" Williams Jr. – producer (tracks: 1-3, 6, 12, 15-17), engineering, mixing
Samuel "The Legendary Traxster" Lindley – producer (tracks: 4, 5, 7, 8, 10, 11, 13, 14), engineering, mixing
Mike Dean – producer (track 9), engineering, mixing, mastering
James A. Smith – executive producer
Donavin "Kid Styles" Murray – art direction, photography
Barrencia Marcee – art direction
Lisa Browne – art direction

Charts

Certifications

References

External links

1998 albums
Do or Die (group) albums
Rap-A-Lot Records albums
Albums produced by The Legendary Traxster
Albums produced by Mike Dean (record producer)